The 1997 Chicago White Sox season was the White Sox's 98th season. They finished with a record of 80-81, good enough for 2nd place in the American League Central, 6 games behind the 1st place Cleveland Indians.

Offseason 
 November 19, 1996: Albert Belle signed as a free agent with the Chicago White Sox.
 January 14, 1997: Doug Drabek was signed as a free agent with the Chicago White Sox.
 February 7, 1997: Danny Darwin signed as a free agent with the Chicago White Sox.

Regular season 

 June 16 – The first interleague game between the Chicago Cubs and Chicago White Sox took place at Comiskey Park II. The Cubs won the game by a score of 8-3.
 September 14 – Chicago White Sox retire catcher Carlton Fisk's No. 72 in a ceremony before the Sept. 14 game against Cleveland Indians.

Albert Belle 
In the winter of 1996, Belle signed a 5-year, $55 million deal with the Chicago White Sox as a free agent. This contract made him the highest paid player in baseball for a brief period. Belle enjoyed two great seasons in Chicago, including a career-high 27-game hitting streak in May 1997. Belle came close to having another 50/50 season in 1998, with 49 home runs and 48 doubles. Additionally, when Cal Ripken ended his record consecutive game streak in September 1998, it was Belle who took over as the major leagues' active leader in the category. Belle's White Sox contract had an unusual clause allowing him to demand that he would remain one of the three highest paid players in baseball.

Season standings

Record vs. opponents

1997 Opening Day lineup 
 Tony Phillips, RF
 Dave Martinez, CF
 Frank Thomas, 1B
 Albert Belle, LF
 Harold Baines, DH
 Chris Snopek, 3B
 Ray Durham, 2B
 Ron Karkovice, C
 Ozzie Guillén, SS
 Jaime Navarro, P

Notable Transactions 
May 18, 1997: Tony Phillips was traded by the Chicago White Sox with Chad Kreuter to the Anaheim Angels for Chuck McElroy and Jorge Fábregas.

The White Flag Trade 

The White Flag Trade was a trade made in 1997. On July 31, 1997, the Chicago White Sox traded three major players to the San Francisco Giants for six minor leaguers. At the time, the trade was maligned by the vast majority of White Sox fans as Jerry Reinsdorf giving up on the team, as they were only 3.5 games behind the Cleveland Indians for the American League Central Division lead. In 2000, however, the White Sox won the Central Division title, receiving large contributions from two of the players received in this trade.

 The Chicago White Sox received:
 Keith Foulke, right-handed pitcher
 Bob Howry, right-handed pitcher
 Lorenzo Barceló, right-handed pitcher
 Ken Vining, left-handed pitcher
 Mike Caruso, shortstop
 Brian Manning
 The San Francisco Giants received:
 Wilson Álvarez, left-handed pitcher
 Danny Darwin, right-handed pitcher
 Roberto Hernández, right-handed pitcher

Roster

Player stats

Batting 
Note: G = Games played; AB = At bats; R = Runs scored; H = Hits; 2B = Doubles; 3B = Triples; HR = Home runs; RBI = Runs batted in; BB = Base on balls; SO = Strikeouts; AVG = Batting average; SB = Stolen bases

Pitching 
Note: W = Wins; L = Losses; ERA = Earned run average; G = Games pitched; GS = Games started; SV = Saves; IP = Innings pitched; H = Hits allowed; R = Runs allowed; ER = Earned runs allowed; HR = Home runs allowed; BB = Walks allowed; K = Strikeouts

Farm system

References

External links 
 1997 Chicago White Sox at Baseball Reference

Chicago White Sox seasons
Chicago White Sox season
White